Tyrosine sulfation is a posttranslational modification where a sulfate group is added to a tyrosine residue of a protein molecule. Secreted proteins and extracellular parts of membrane proteins that pass through the Golgi apparatus may be sulfated. Sulfation was first discovered by Bettelheim in bovine fibrinopeptide B in 1954 and later found to be present in animals and plants but not in prokaryotes or in yeast.

Function
Sulfation plays a role in strengthening protein-protein interactions. Types of human proteins known to undergo tyrosine sulfation include adhesion molecules, G-protein-coupled receptors, coagulation factors, serine protease inhibitors, extracellular matrix proteins, and hormones.
Tyrosine O-sulfate is a stable molecule and is excreted in urine in animals. No enzymatic mechanism of tyrosine sulfate desulfation is known to exist.

By knock-out of TPST genes in mice, it may be observed that tyrosine sulfation has effects on the growth of the mice, such as body weight, fecundity, and postnatal viability.

Mechanism
Sulfation is catalyzed by tyrosylprotein sulfotransferase (TPST) in the Golgi apparatus. The reaction catalyzed by TPST is a transfer of sulfate from the universal sulfate donor 3'-phosphoadenosine-5'-phosphosulfate (PAPS) to the side-chain hydroxyl group of a tyrosine residue. Sulfation sites are tyrosine residues exposed on the surface of the protein typically surrounded by acidic residues; a detailed description of the characteristics of the sulfation site was available from PROSITE (PROSITE pattern: PS00003) and predicted by an on-line tool named the Sulfinator . Two types of tyrosylprotein sulftotransferases (TPST-1 and TPST2) have been identified.

Regulation
There is very limited evidence that the TPST genes are subject to transcriptional regulation and tyrosine O-sulfate is very stable and cannot be easily degraded by mammalian sulfatases. Tyrosine O-sulfation is an irreversible process in vivo.

Clinical Significance 
It has been shown that the sulfation of Tyr1680 in Factor VIII is essential for effective binding to vWF. Thus, when this is mutated, patients may suffer mild haemophiliac symptoms due to increased turnover.

Antibody for detection of tyrosine-sulfated epitopes
In 2006, an article was published in the Journal of Biological Chemistry describing the production and characterization of an antibody called PSG2.  This antibody shows exquisite sensitivity and specificity for epitopes containing sulfotyrosine independent of the sequence context.

References

 
 

Post-translational modification